The Third Drees cabinet, also called the Fourth Drees cabinet, was the executive branch of the Dutch Government from 13 October 1956 until 22 December 1958. The cabinet was a continuation of the previous Second Drees cabinet and was formed by the social-democratic Labour Party (PvdA) and the christian-democratic Catholic People's Party (KVP), Anti-Revolutionary Party (ARP) and the Christian Historical Union (CHU) after the election of 1956. The cabinet was a centrist grand coalition and had a substantial majority in the House of Representatives, with Labour Leader Willem Drees serving as Prime Minister. Prominent KVP politician Teun Struycken (a former Governor of the Netherlands Antilles) served as Deputy Prime Minister and Minister of the Interior, Property and Public Organisations.

The cabinet served during the middle years of the turbulent 1950s. Domestically, the recovery and rebuilding following World War II continued with the assistance of the Marshall Plan, it also able to finalize several major social reforms to social security, welfare, child benefits and education from the previous cabinet. Internationally the decolonization of the Dutch East Indies continued. After suffering several major internal and external conflicts, including multiple cabinet resignations, the cabinet fell two years into its term, on 11 December 1958, following a disagreement in the coalition over a proposed tax increase; the cabinet continued in a demissionary capacity until it was replaced with the caretaker Second Beel cabinet on 22 December 1958.

Formation
The cabinet formation took four months. This was the longest and most difficult formation the Netherlands had ever seen, partly as a result of the rising tensions between the Labour Party and the Catholic People's Party. After the formation these tensions kept rising, leading to the fall of the cabinet in December 1958. The root of the tensions was the decision of the Roman Catholic Church to excommunicate Catholic socialists from the church. Nearly 100% of the south of the Netherlands used to vote for the Catholic People's Party for decades, but in the 1950s secular political parties got an increase in votes. The excommunication had the result of social exclusion in cities and villages which used to be solidly Catholic blocks. Protestants in the north supported the Catholics.

Term
After considerable growth after World War II, the rising wages, combined with lowered taxes, now led to overspending, which endangered the export. In reaction, wages and government spending were both lowered.

Rising tension with Indonesia, mostly about New Guinea, came to a climax when Indonesia nationalised Dutch properties in the country. The Dutch were supposed to leave entirely.

Other international problems were the Suez Crisis and the Hungarian revolt, which led to monetary and economic problems. The threat of an oil crisis as a result of the Suez crisis led to the installation of car-free Sundays. The suppression of the Hungarian revolution by the USSR led to plundering of communist institutions. Several thousands of Hungarian refugees were accepted into the Netherlands and welcomed in Dutch homes.

On 1 January 1957, the state pension AOW after the age of 65, that was proposed during the former cabinet Drees II, was installed. This resulted from a previous emergency law by Drees, and is the one thing he is remembered for most.

Cabinet members

Trivia
 Eight cabinet members had previous experience as scholars and professors: Henk Hofstra (Fiscal Law), Ivo Samkalden (Agricultural Law), Jelle Zijlstra (Public Economics), Anne Vondeling (Agronomy and Agricultural Engineering), Marga Klompé (Chemistry), Gerard Veldkamp (Microeconomics), Aat van Rhijn (Fiscal Law) and Anna de Waal (Geography).
 Five cabinet members would later be granted the honorary title of Minister of State: Willem Drees (1958), Ivo Samkalden (1985), Jelle Zijlstra (1983), Jo Cals (1966) and Marga Klompé (1971).
 Four cabinet members (later) served as Party Leaders and Lijsttrekkers: Willem Drees (1946–1946) of the Social Democratic Workers' Party and (1946–1958) of the Labour Party, Anne Vondeling (1962–1966) of the Labour Party, Jelle Zijlstra (1956, 1958–1959) of the Anti-Revolutionary Party and Norbert Schmelzer (1963–1971) of the Catholic People's Party.

References

External links
Official

  Kabinet-Drees IV Parlement & Politiek
  Kabinet-Drees III Rijksoverheid

Cabinets of the Netherlands
1956 establishments in the Netherlands
1958 disestablishments in the Netherlands
Cabinets established in 1956
Cabinets disestablished in 1958
Grand coalition governments